The Lithuania–Russia border is an international border between the Republic of Lithuania (EU member) and Kaliningrad Oblast, an exclave of the Russian Federation (CIS member). It is an external border of the European Union. The sea border is another .

Most of the border follows rivers or lakes. On land, border stations are equipped with engineering and technical facilities (wired fences and the exclusion zone). Crossing the border into Lithuania requires a Schengen visa, and into Russia requires a Russian visa.

In early 2017, with increasing military activity and political tensions in the region, the Lithuanian government announced plans to reinforce the Kaliningrad/Ramoniškiai area border crossing with a fence  in height, funded by NATO.

History

Historical borders between the Grand Duchy of Lithuania and Tsardom of Russia varied significantly throughout history, and at times bore little resemblance to the modern borders. The border between the countries runs along the line of the former Lithuanian–German border established in 1918. It bordered Lithuania and East Prussia. In 1923, the Klaipėda Region (Memelland) was transferred to Lithuania, but in 1939 Lithuania was forced to return it to Germany. The current Lithuanian–Russian border was established after World War II, when Königsberg and the territory around it was annexed by the Soviet Union. In 1945, following the Soviet occupation of the Baltic states, the boundary was an internal border of the Soviet Union between the Kaliningrad Oblast of RSFSR and the Lithuanian SSR. 

In 1990, Lithuania restored its independence and the boundary became an international border again, making Kaliningrad Oblast an exclave. In 1997, the Russian Federation and the Republic of Lithuania signed a border agreement, intended to complete border demarcation and to reduce inconveniences of the border. For example, at Lake Vištytis the border ran along the waterline of the beaches on the Lithuanian side, so anyone paddling in the water was technically crossing into Russia. In return, Russia received the appropriate territorial compensation in other areas. The treaty entered into force in 2003.

Border crossings

References

External links 
 

 
Borders of Lithuania
Borders of Russia
European Union external borders
Internal borders of the Soviet Union
International borders
Lithuania–Russia relations